Strophanthus speciosus, commonly known as the forest poison rope, is a tree, shrub or woody climber which is native to southern Africa.

Description
Its flowers feature a white turning orange corolla, red-streaked on the inside.

Distribution and habitat
Strophanthus speciosus is native to Zimbabwe, South Africa and Eswatini. It occurs in forests and their margins from  altitude.

Uses
Local medicinal uses of S. speciosus include snakebite treatment. The plant has also been used as arrow poison. As with other species of Strophanthus it contains the cardiac glycoside strophanthin - plants of allied genera contain similar compounds.

Gallery

References

speciosus
Plants used in traditional African medicine
Flora of Zimbabwe
Flora of Southern Africa
Plants described in 1841